John Alexander (born 5 October 1955) is an English former footballer who holds the post of club secretary at Manchester United.

Born in Liverpool, Alexander began his football career with a club called Ulysses, before being picked up by Millwall, for whom he made his league debut in 1976. After scoring twice in 15 appearances over the course of two years with Millwall, he moved to Reading; he enjoyed greater success with Reading, scoring nine goals in 25 games. In 1981, he joined Northampton Town, but spent just one season with them before retiring from football at the age of 26 in 1982.

Upon retiring from football, Alexander got a job with the BBC, but he later returned to football as club secretary at Watford. In 2000, he took up the same post at Tottenham Hotspur, spending ten years there before applying for the same job at Manchester United, where he would replace the retiring Ken Ramsden. He took over at Manchester United on 1 July 2010. He is the uncle of Liverpool player Trent Alexander-Arnold.

References

External links

1955 births
Living people
Footballers from Liverpool
English footballers
Association football forwards
Millwall F.C. players
Reading F.C. players
Northampton Town F.C. players
English Football League players
Association football executives
Watford F.C. directors
Tottenham Hotspur F.C. non-playing staff
Manchester United F.C. non-playing staff